Dutch-Serbian are foreign relations between the Netherlands and Serbia. Both countries re-established diplomatic relations on April 26, 1899. The Netherlands is an EU member while Serbia is an EU candidate. 

There are between 10,000 and 15,000 people of Serbian descent living in the Netherlands.

Resident diplomatic missions 
 Netherlands has an embassy in Belgrade.
 Serbia has an embassy in The Hague.

See also 
 Foreign relations of the Netherlands
 Foreign relations of Serbia
 Kosovo–Netherlands relations
 Accession of Serbia to the European Union

References

External links 
Dutch Ministry of Foreign Affairs about the relation with Serbia (in Dutch only)
Dutch embassy in Belgrade
Serbian Ministry of Foreign Affairs about the relation with the Netherlands
Serbian embassy in The Hague

 

 
Serbia
Netherlands